The order Afrosoricida (a Latin-Greek compound name which means "looking like African shrews") contains the golden moles of Southern Africa, the otter shrews of equatorial Africa and the tenrecs of Madagascar. These three families of small mammals have traditionally been considered to be a part of the order Insectivora, and were later included in Lipotyphla after Insectivora was abandoned as a wastebasket taxon, before Lipotyphla was also found to be polyphyletic.

Naming
Some biologists use Tenrecomorpha as the name for the tenrec-golden mole clade, but Gary Bronner and Paulina Jenkins argue that Afrosoricida is more appropriate, despite their misgivings about the similarity between the name "Afrosoricida" and the unrelated shrew subgenus Afrosorex. However, Afrosorex Hutterer, 1986 is a synonym of Crocidura Wagler, 1832, eliminating any confusion. Hedges discussed at length the problems with using Tenrecomorpha and other proposed names for this clade of mammals other than Afrosoricida.

Biology
As a rule, tenrecs and otter shrews tend to be small animals varying from 4 cm to 39 cm in length. There is no pronounced body type since they have evolved to take over the insect-eating niche in Madagascar. However, based on the niche occupied, they look like shrews, hedgehogs or miniature otters. Their coat can vary from smooth to spiny and the coloration of the fur is generally dirt brown. Most species are also nocturnal and have poor eyesight. However, their whiskers are rather sensitive and they can detect very minute vibrations in the ground to locate their prey.

Phylogeny

Traditionally, these two families were grouped with the hedgehogs, shrews and moles in the Lipotyphla. However, there have always been minority opinions suggesting that Tenrecomorpha, or at least the golden moles, are not true lipotyphlans. These opinions are now supported by many genetic studies indicating an association between Tenrecomorpha and various other African mammals in the superorder Afrotheria. Afrosoricids are sometimes considered part of the Afroinsectiphilia, a clade within Afrotheria.

 Infraclass Eutheria: placental mammals
 Superorder Afrotheria
 Clade Afroinsectiphilia
 Clade Afroinsectivora
 Order Afrosoricida
 Suborder Tenrecomorpha (otter shrews and tenrecs)
 Family Potamogalidae (otter shrews)
 Genus Micropotamogale
 Nimba otter shrew (Micropotamogale lamottei)
 Ruwenzori otter shrew (Micropotamogale ruwenzorii)
 Genus Potamogale
 Giant otter shrew (Potamogale velox)
 Family Tenrecidae (tenrecs)
 Subfamily Geogalinae (1 species)
 Genus Geogale
 Large-eared tenrec (Geogale aurita)
 Subfamily Oryzorictinae (24 species)
 Genus Microgale
 Short-tailed shrew tenrec (Microgale brevicaudata)
 Cowan's shrew tenrec (Microgale cowani)
 Drouhard's shrew tenrec (Microgale drouhardi)
 Dryad shrew tenrec (Microgale dryas)
 Pale shrew tenrec (Microgale fotsifotsy)
 Gracile shrew tenrec (Microgale gracilis)
 Naked-nosed shrew tenrec (Microgale gymnorhyncha)
 Jenkins's shrew tenrec (Microgale jenkinsae)
 Northern shrew tenrec (Microgale jobihely) 
 Lesser long-tailed shrew tenrec (Microgale longicaudata)
 Major's long-tailed tenrec (Microgale majori)
 Web-footed tenrec (Microgale mergulus)
 Montane shrew tenrec (Microgale monticola)
 Nasolo's shrew tenrec (Microgale nasoloi)
 Pygmy shrew tenrec (Microgale parvula)
 Greater long-tailed shrew tenrec (Microgale principula)
 Least shrew tenrec (Microgale pusilla)
 Shrew-toothed shrew tenrec (Microgale soricoides)
 Taiva shrew tenrec (Microgale taiva)
 Thomas's shrew tenrec (Microgale thomasi)
 Genus Nesogale
 Dobson's shrew tenrec (Nesogale dobsoni)
 Talazac's shrew tenrec (Nesogale talazaci)
 Genus Oryzorictes
 Mole-like rice tenrec (Oryzorictes hova)
 Four-toed rice tenrec (Oryzorictes tetradactylus)
 Subfamily Tenrecinae (5 species)
 Genus Echinops
 Lesser hedgehog tenrec (Echinops telfairi)
 Genus Hemicentetes
 Highland streaked tenrec (Hemicentetes nigriceps)
 Lowland streaked tenrec (Hemicentetes semispinosus)
 Genus Setifer
 Greater hedgehog tenrec (Setifer setosus)
 Genus Tenrec
 Tailless tenrec (Tenrec ecaudatus)
 Incertae familiae: Genus †Plesiorycteropus
 †Plesiorycteropus madagascariensis
 †Plesiorycteropus germainepetterae
 Suborder Chrysochloridea (golden moles)
 Family Chrysochloridae (golden moles)
 Subfamily Chrysochlorinae (11 species)
 Genus Carpitalpa
 Arends' golden mole (Carpitalpa arendsi)
 Genus Chlorotalpa
 Duthie's golden mole (Chlorotalpa duthieae)
 Sclater's golden mole (Chlorotalpa sclateri)
 Genus Chrysochloris
 Subgenus Chrysochloris
 Cape golden mole (Chrysochloris asiatica)
 Visagie's golden mole (Chrysochloris visagiei)
 Subgenus Kilimatalpa
 Stuhlmann's golden mole (Chrysochloris stuhlmanni)
 Genus Chrysospalax
 Giant golden mole (Chrysospalax trevelyani)
 Rough-haired golden mole (Chrysospalax villosus)
 Genus Cryptochloris
 De Winton's golden mole (Cryptochloris wintoni)
 Van Zyl's golden mole (Cryptochloris zyli)
 Genus Eremitalpa
 Grant's golden mole (Eremitalpa granti)
 Subfamily Amblysominae (10 species)
 Genus Amblysomus
 Fynbos golden mole (Amblysomus corriae)
 Hottentot golden mole (Amblysomus hottentotus)
 Marley's golden mole (Amblysomus marleyi)
 Robust golden mole (Amblysomus robustus)
 Highveld golden mole (Amblysomus septentrionalis)
 Genus Calcochloris
 Subgenus Huetia
 Congo golden mole (Calcochloris leucorhinus)
 Subgenus Calcochloris
 Yellow golden mole (Calcochloris obtusirostris)
 Subgenus incertae sedis
 Somali golden mole (Calcochloris tytonis)
 Genus Neamblysomus
 Juliana's golden mole (Neamblysomus julianae)
 Gunning's golden mole (Neamblysomus gunningi)

See also

 Pseudoungulata
 List of mammals of Madagascar

References

 
Mammal orders
Extant Miocene first appearances